Phietswana is a small village in the Barolong sub-district of the Southern District, Botswana. The population was 682 per the 2011 census.

References

 Botswana Central Statistics Office

Villages in Botswana
Southern District (Botswana)